Adam Holender (born 13 November 1937) is a Polish cinematographer, best known for his work on Midnight Cowboy.

He was born 13 November 1937 in Kraków, Poland, the son of a judge. In 1939, he and his family were deported to a Siberian labor camp, and not allowed to return to Kraków until 1947.

Holender studied architecture before enrolling at PWSFTviT in Lódz, from where he graduated in 1964.

Midnight Cowboy was Holender's first cinematography assignment: he was recommended to director John Schlesinger by Holender's childhood friend, filmmaker Roman Polanski. According to Schlesinger his inspiration to make the movie came from the 1967 Yugoslav film When I Am Dead and Gone by a Serbian director Živojin Pavlović.

Filmography

References

1937 births
Living people
Polish cinematographers